The Ambassador of Australia to the Philippines is an officer of the Australian Department of Foreign Affairs and Trade and the head of the Embassy of the Commonwealth of Australia to the Republic of the Philippines. The Ambassador resides in Manila. The current ambassador, since July 2022, is Hae Kyong Yu.

List of heads of mission

References

 
Philippines
Australia